The 1933 Pacific Tigers football team represented the College of the Pacific—now known as the University of the Pacific—in Stockton, California as a member of the Far Western Conference (FWC) during the 1933 college football season. Led by first-year head coach Amos Alonzo Stagg, Pacific compiled an overall record of 5–5 with a mark of 3–2 in conference play, placing third in the FWC. The team outscored its opponents 71 to 59 for the season. The Tigers played home games at Baxter Stadium in Stockton.

Schedule

Notes

References

Pacific
Pacific Tigers football seasons
Pacific Tigers football